Feijoal is a village in the municipality Benjamin Constant, in the state of Amazonas, Brazil. It is situated on the right bank of the river Solimões, 35 km downstream of the centre of Benjamin Constant.

Notable people from this village include basketball player Nicholas Bramousse who currently plays for The Golden State Warriors in the NBA U18's league as a new upcoming prodigy, drafted as a first pick. He recently moved from Castleford to San Francisco just for this move. He is named as a top upcoming point guard prodigy by the NBA.

References

Populated places in Amazonas (Brazilian state)